Radix balthica, common name the wandering snail, is a species of air-breathing freshwater snail, an aquatic pulmonate gastropod mollusk in the family Lymnaeidae, the pond snails.

Taxonomy
The taxonomic status of certain species in the genus Radix has been disputed. Remigio (2002) reported sequence divergence within the 16S mitochondrial gene of Radix peregra and Radix ovata. Furthermore, the shell morphology and alloenzyme data indicated that Radix peregra and Radix ovata are distinct.

In contrast, Bargues et al. (2001) considered on the basis of ITS-2 sequence analysis, that R. peregra, R. ovata, and R. balthica are in fact a conspecific species.

Distribution 
All of eastern Europe to western Siberia, as well as north Africa, Asia Minor and Afghanistan. Eurosiberian Wide Temperate . 
This species is found in European countries and islands including:
 Countries surrounding the Baltic Sea
 Romania
 Germany
 British Isles: Great Britain and Ireland
 Netherlands
 Czech Republic
 Slovakia

Genetics 
The complete mitochondrial genome of Radix balthica has been obtained by shotgun sequencing and has been released in 2010. The length of the mitochondrial DNA is 13,993 nucleotides, containing 37 genes.

Biology
Radix balthica live in rivers, creeks, streams, streamlets and stagnant waters. They have a high degree of tolerance to pH levels, salinity concentrations and temperature conditions, but prefer calcareous waters (Welter-Schulte 2009).

Reproduction: These snails are hermaphroditic, like all species of Lymnaeidae , but have separate sexual apertures and are not inbreeding . During copulation, the snail taking the role of a male overlaps onto another individual, presenting its penis to the opening of the recipient snail. Several individuals can overlap in this way - some simultaneously playing the role of a male and female . The eggs are laid in gelatinous cords, about 1 centimeter in length, on hard substrates such as rocks, wood or aquatic plants. The offspring develop via yolk-rich eggs, from which the developed animalcules hatch as miniature versions of the parents (there is no larval stage) . Copulation and oviposition takes place from March when the snails are about 1 year old . This species has a generation length of approximately 1 year .

Respiration: Radix balthica breathe air through a lung, while also absorbing oxygen from the water through their skin. Their short, broad tentacles increase the surface area of the skin, allowing increased oxygen absorption 
. Their blood contains haemocyanin, giving the head and foot a pale green color. They can adjust their density by movements of the muscles in the mantle and quickly rise to the surface of the water or quickly drop down in the water column .

Food: Radix balthica feed on algae and bacterial biofilms on hard substrates, as well as feeding on detritus. Mainly green algae and protozoans are consumed in some habitats, and in other habitats mainly detritus may be consumed. Radix balthica do not eat plants that are in good health .

Parasites of Radix balthica include trematode Aspidogaster limacoides.

References

External links 

Radix balthica at Animalbase taxonomy,short description, distribution, biology,status (threats), images
 Pfenninger M., Salinger M., Haun T. & Feldmeyer B. (2011). "Factors and processes shaping the population structure and distribution of genetic variation across the species range of the freshwater snail Radix balthica (Pulmonata, Basommatophora)". BMC Evolutionary Biology 11: 135. .

Lymnaeidae
Gastropods described in 1758
Taxa named by Carl Linnaeus